Thinking of You may refer to:

Albums

 Thinking of You (Bogdan Raczynski album), 2000
 Thinking of You (Duke Jordan album), 1982
 Thinking of You (Houston Person album), 2010
 Thinking of You (Kitarō album), 1999

Songs
"Thinking of You" (1927 song), a popular song written by Harry Ruby and Bert Kalmar
"Thinking of You" (Bonnie Pink song), 2001
"Thinking of You" (Earth, Wind & Fire song), 1988 
"Thinking of You" (Hanson song), 1997
"Thinking of You" (Katy Perry song), 2008
"Thinking of You" (Lenny Kravitz song), 1998
"Thinking of You" (Loggins and Messina song), 1973
"Thinking of You" (Sa-Fire song), 1989
"Thinking of You" (Sister Sledge song), 1984
"Thinking of You" (Status Quo song), 2004
"Thinking of You (I Drive Myself Crazy)", a 1998 song by NSYNC
"Thinking of You", a song by A Perfect Circle from Mer de Noms
"Thinking of You", a song by A Tough of Class from Planet Pop
"Thinking of You", a song by Fats Domino
"Thinking of You", a song by Harlequin
"Thinking of You", a song by Herman's Hermits from Herman's Hermits
"Thinking of You", a song by Joe Satriani from Time Machine
"Thinking of You", a song by Kesha from Warrior
"Thinking of You", a song by Mabel from High Expectations
"Thinking of You", a song by Tesla Boy from Modern Thrills
"Thinking of You", a song by The Colourfield from Virgins and Philistines